The Men's team Nordic combined competition for the 2006 Winter Olympics was held in Pragelato, Italy. It was originally scheduled for 15 February, but high winds meant that only part of the ski jumping competition was completed on that day, with the conclusion, and the cross-country race, taking place on 16 February.

Results

Ski Jumping

Each of the four team members, performed two jumps, which were judged in the same fashion as the Olympic ski jumping competition. The scores for all the jumps each team took were summed, and used to calculate their deficit in the cross-country race. Each one point behind the leading score of Germany was equivalent to one second of time deficit. Heavy winds delayed the competition after the first round of jumps; these jumps eventually counted, and the competition was resumed the following day. The world championship team from Norway had to pull out of the competition, as four of its athletes became sick. Had the competition been restarted, they would have been able to compete with a different group of athletes, but keeping the scores from the first day meant that Norway was out. Italy also had to pull out, when Davide Bresadola was forced to go to hospital on account of illness.

Cross-Country
The start for the 4 x 5 kilometre relay race was staggered, with a one-point deficit in the ski jump portion resulting in a one second deficit in starting the cross-country course. This stagger meant that the first team across the finish line, Austria was the overall winner of the event. The German team, which started first, led after the third relay leg, but Austria's Mario Stecher gained 36 seconds on Germany's Jens Gaiser on the final leg, taking the Austrian team to the gold medal.

References

Nordic combined at the 2006 Winter Olympics